Boyleston is an unincorporated community in Michigan Township, Clinton County, Indiana.

History
Lewis N. Boyle of Indianapolis platted the town of Boyleston on November 17, 1875, along the Lake Erie and Western Railroad. A post office was established at Boyleston in 1877, and remained in operation until it was discontinued in 1951.

Geography

References

Unincorporated communities in Clinton County, Indiana
Unincorporated communities in Indiana
1875 establishments in Indiana
Populated places established in 1875